Colección Jumex is a private art collection owned by Eugenio López Alonso. It includes around 2,800 works by Damien Hirst, Andy Warhol, Gabriel Orozco, Cy Twombly, Jeff Koons, Marcel Duchamp, Andreas Gursky, Darren Almond, Tacita Dean, Olafur Eliasson, Martin Kippenberger, Carl Hopgood, Bruce Nauman, David Ostrowski, Francis Alÿs, Urs Fischer, Gego, Donald Judd, Ed Ruscha, Nancy Rubins, Richard Prince, and Martin Creed.

History
Eugenio López Alonso purchased his first work of Mexican art in 1994. This was the symbolic beginning of Fundación Jumex Arte Contemporáneo: from the outset, López was more interested in sharing his interest in art than in amassing a collection of objects.

Over the 1990s, Eugenio López spent his time studying contemporary art while also traveling and researching how to put together a collection that would encourage the development of the work of artists of his generation in Mexico.

Buying pieces by local and foreign artists while further broadening his scope and focus as a collector, López conceived Fundación Jumex with a team of art professionals in order to promote contemporary art through programs that involved collecting, education, research and the funding of artists and museums.

In 2015, Fundación Jumex made international headlines when it cancelled an exhibition of works by Hermann Nitsch, a decision denounced by collectors, curators and art critics as an "embarrassing act of censorship by a group striving to establish itself in the international art circuit."

Venues

Galería Jumex
From 2001, López’s collection was exhibited publicly for the first time at Galería Jumex: a  space designed by Gerardo García on the premises of the Grupo Jumex juice plant in Ecatepec de Morelos. Though one sector of the art community was surprised by the gallery’s location in an industrial area on the outskirts of Mexico City, López and his team were convinced that this space for experimentation would further aid the development of contemporary art in Mexico.

Museo Jumex
Located in the Polanco neighborhood of Mexico City, Museo Jumex opened its doors to the public in November 2013 as an institution devoted to contemporary art, whose aim was not only to serve a broad and diverse public, but also to become a laboratory for experimentation and innovation in the arts. Rosario Nadal serves as the deputy director of the museum.

The building was designed by David Chipperfield Architects with an  exhibition space. It is part of the mixed-use development Plaza Carso, which also includes a shopping mall, and sits across the street from another museum, Museo Soumaya. It was conceived in response to its surroundings and local context, incorporating domestically sourced materials. In addition to exhibition galleries, the museum features public spaces designed as meeting places and leisure areas that complement the visitor’s experience.

Directors
 1997–2005: Patricia Martín 
 2005–2015: Patrick Charpenel 
 2015–2019: Julieta González

References

External links
Fundación Jumex website

Art museums and galleries in Mexico
Museums in Mexico City
Contemporary art galleries in Mexico
Modern art museums
Miguel Hidalgo, Mexico City
Former private collections
Art museums established in 2013
Cultural infrastructure completed in 2013
2013 establishments in Mexico
David Chipperfield buildings